Sylvia Ng Meow Eng (born 24 September 1949 in Johor Bahru) is a former badminton player from Malaysia. She was inducted into the Olympic Council of Malaysia's Hall of Fame in 2004.

Career 
Her major international success in 1969 was at the Southeast Asia Games in Rangoon, where she won the women's singles. Four years later, she was again successful in the same event in women's singles. In 1970, she won the mixed doubles at the Belgian International partnering Ng Boon Bee. At the Asian Games in 1970 she was also successful with Ng Boon Bee in Mixed Doubles and finished third in the Women's Singles. Again with Boon Bee she won a year later at the Canadian Open in the Mixed Doubles category.

At the Commonwealth Games in 1974, she won the bronze medal in women's doubles together with Rosalind Singha Ang. In the Asian Games 1974, she finished without a medal. In 1977 she won another gold at the Southeast Asian Games held in Kuala Lumpur. She also won a Commonwealth Games gold for women's singles in 1978.

Sylvia was Malaysia's Sportswoman of the Year twice in 1975 & 1978.

Achievements

Asian Games 
Women singles

Mixed doubles

Asian Championships 
Women's singles

Southeast Asian Peninsular Games/Southeast Asian Games 
Women's singles

Women's doubles

Mixed doubles

Commonwealth Games 
Women's singles

Women's doubles

International tournaments 
Women's singles 

Mixed doubles

Invitational tournament 
Women's doubles

Honour

Honour of Malaysia
  : 
 Member of the Order of the Defender of the Realm (A.M.N.) (1982)

References 

1949 births
Malaysian female badminton players
Asian Games medalists in badminton
Badminton players at the 1970 Asian Games
Badminton players at the 1974 Asian Games
Badminton players at the 1974 British Commonwealth Games
Badminton players at the 1978 Commonwealth Games
Commonwealth Games bronze medallists for Malaysia
Commonwealth Games gold medallists for Malaysia
Living people
Malaysian sportspeople of Chinese descent
Commonwealth Games medallists in badminton
Asian Games gold medalists for Malaysia
Asian Games bronze medalists for Malaysia
Southeast Asian Games gold medalists for Malaysia
Southeast Asian Games medalists in badminton
Members of the Order of the Defender of the Realm
Medalists at the 1970 Asian Games
Competitors at the 1969 Southeast Asian Peninsular Games
Competitors at the 1977 Southeast Asian Games
20th-century Malaysian women
Medallists at the 1974 British Commonwealth Games
Medallists at the 1978 Commonwealth Games